The following is a list of Franco-Ontarians.

A
Levi Addison Ault, businessman and bureaucrat closely associated with Cincinnati, Ohio
Marcel Aymar, singer

B
Estelle Beauchamp, writer
Érik Bédard, former starting pitcher for 6 teams in  Major League Baseball
Mauril Bélanger, federal Member of Parliament
Napoléon Belcourt, Speaker of the House of Commons (1904–1905)
Rhéal Bélisle, politician
Avril Benoît, former radio broadcaster
Justin Bieber, singer
Gilles Bisson, Member of Provincial Parliament
Paul Bissonnette, NHL player
Stephen Blais, politician
Hector "Toe" Blake, NHL player and coach
Michel Bock, historian
Raymond Bonin, federal Member of Parliament
Evan Bouchard, NHL player
Bruce Boudreau, NHL coach
Maxime Boudreault, World's Strongest Man competitor
Don Boudria, federal Member of Parliament
Guy Bourgouin, Member of Provincial Parliament
Dan Boyle, NHL player
Lysette Brochu, writer
Andrew Brunette, NHL player
Paul Byron, NHL player

C
Lorenzo Cadieux, writer
Robert Campeau, financier, real estate developer
Joseph Caron, diplomat, Canadian High Commissioner to India
Jim Carrey, comedian, actor
Joseph Médard Carrière, academic
Roch Castonguay, actor
Soufiane Chakkouche, writer and journalist
Mathieu Chantelois, television personality, journalist, magazine editor, and marketing executive
Louise Charron, Supreme Court justice
Andrée Christensen, writer
Dan Cloutier, National Hockey League goaltender
Cal Clutterbuck, NHL player
Lucille Collard, politician

D
Michel Dallaire, writer
Jean-Marc Dalpé, writer
Gaston Demers, politician
Paul Demers, singer-songwriter
Paul Desmarais Jr., CEO Power Corporation of Montreal
Nathalie Des Rosiers, politician
Véronic DiCaire, singer and imitator
Robert Dickson, writer
Dionne quintuplets
Ron Duguay, NHL hockey player

F
Jean Mohsen Fahmy, writer

G
Royal Galipeau, federal Member of Parliament
Jean-Robert Gauthier, federal Member of Parliament and Senator
Léo Gauthier, politician
France Gélinas, member of the Legislative Assembly of Ontario
Doric Germain, writer and academic
Gaétan Gervais, writer and academic
Claude Giroux, National Hockey League player
Marc Godbout, federal Member of Parliament
Osias Godin, politician
Ryan Gosling, actor
Sebastien Grainger, musician (Death From Above 1979, Sebastien Grainger and the Mountains)
Gil Grand, musician
Pierre Granger, host and journalist (Le Téléjournal, Panorama)
Claude Gravelle, politician
Valérie Grenier, World Cup Gold medalist alpine skier
Erik Gudbranson, NHL player

H
Bob Hartley, National Hockey League coach
Chantal Hébert, journalist and commentator
Maurice Henrie, writer

J
Aurèle Joliat, NHL player
Claude Julien, National Hockey League coach

L
Chuck Labelle, country music artist from Mattawa, Ontario
Chloé LaDuchesse, poet
Kevin Lalande, NHL player
Marie-France Lalonde, politician
Newsy Lalonde, hockey player
Edmond Lapierre, politician
Viviane Lapointe, politician
Claude Larose, NHL player
Avril Lavigne, singer
J. Conrad Lavigne, broadcast media proprietor
Didier Leclair, writer
Paul Lefebvre, former federal Member of Parliament and mayor of Greater Sudbury
Julie Lemieux, voice actress

M
Daniel Marchildon, writer
Robert Marinier, writer and actor
Diane Marleau, federal Member of Parliament and former Minister of Health
Elie Martel, politician
Shelley Martel, Member of Provincial Parliament, former Ministry of Northern Development and Mines (Ontario)
Jacques Martin, National Hockey League coach
Paul Martin (born 1936), former Prime Minister of Canada
Marc Mayer, art curator
Melchior Mbonimpa, writer and academic
Marc Méthot, NHL player
Joseph Montferrand (1802–1864), logger, inspiration for Big Joe Mufferaw legend
Blain Morin, politician
Guy Paul Morin, wrongfully convicted of the murder of Christine Jessop
Alanis Morissette (born 1974), singer
Wade Morissette (born 1974), musician and author; twin brother of Alanis

N
Richard Nadeau, Canadian politician, former Bloc Québécois Member of Parliament
Isabelle Nélisse, actress
Sophie Nélisse, actress

O
Gabriel Osson, writer

P
André Paiement, Canadian playwright and musician
Rachel Paiement, singer and songwriter
Wilf Paiement, NHL player
Daniel Paillé, NHL player
B. P. Paquette, filmmaker
Robert Paquette, folksinger
Stéphane Paquette, singer
François Paré, author and academic
Gilbert Parent, Speaker of the House of Commons (1994–2001)
Jean-Paul Parisé, NHL player
Matthew Peca, NHL player
Suzanne Pinel, children's entertainer (Marie-Soleil)
Jean Poirier, provincial politician and current head of ACFO
Daniel Poliquin, novelist
Denis Potvin, NHL player
Gabrielle Poulin, writer
Marie Poulin, senator and current president of the Liberal Party of Canada
Benoît Pouliot, professional hockey player
Gilles Pouliot, provincial minister and Ontario New Democratic Party MPP

Q
Jason Quenneville, music producer, songwriter

R
Morris Rainville, musician, songwriter
F. Baxter Ricard, broadcast media proprietor
Damien Robitaille, musician
Derek Roy, NHL player

S
Lloyd St. Amand, federal Member of Parliament
Brent St. Denis, federal Member of Parliament
Charles Sauriol, conservationist and naturalist
Benoît Serré, politician
Gaetan Serré, politician
Marc Serré, politician
Amanda Simard, politician
Emma Spence, artistic gymnast
Steve Sullivan, NHL player, hockey manager
Guy Sylvestre, journalist, author, critic and former National Librarian of Canada

T
Glenn Thibeault, politician
Lola Lemire Tostevin, poet and novelist
Alex Trebek (1940–2020), game show host (Jeopardy!)

V
Max Véronneau, NHL player

References

French-speaking Ontarians
+
Lists of people by language
French-speaking
French